Andre Deer (born 16 December 2002), known professionally as Double Lz (formerly stylized as DoubleLz), is a British rapper and songwriter. He is a member of the UK drill group OFB. Debuting in 2018, he would release two mixtapes - Frontstreet and Drill Commandments - alongside Bandokay and SJ in 2019 and 2021, respectively. He released his debut solo mixtape, Two Lz Make a Win, in 2022.

Career
Double Lz released his debut solo single, "Spillings", in May 2018. In 2019, Double Lz, alongside Bandokay and SJ, released Frontstreet, which peaked at number 36 on the UK albums chart and 97th in Ireland. This was followed up by Drill Commandments - released in March 2021 - which peaked at number 53 in the UK.

Personal life
Deer is the son of Kevin Hutchinson-Foster, a drug dealer who was jailed for 11 years in 2013 for providing a gun to Mark Duggan prior to his death. He has one daughter.

Legal issues

In 2022, Double Lz, alongside Bandokay, was charged with violent disorder following a 2021 incident at a Selfridges store, in which two people were stabbed.

Discography

Mixtapes

Singles

As main artist

As featured artist

Guest appearances

Awards and nominations

References

Black British male rappers
Rappers from London
English male rappers
UK drill musicians
Gangsta rappers
Living people
People from Tottenham
2002 births